Éclat, Eclat or ECLAT may refer to:
 Éclat, a piece of music for 15 players by Pierre Boulez from 1965
 Lotus Eclat, a car
 Association rule learning#Eclat algorithm, an algorithm